Metarctia flaviciliata is a moth of the subfamily Arctiinae. It was described by George Hampson in 1907. It is found in Cameroon, the Democratic Republic of the Congo, Kenya and Uganda.

References

External links
 

Metarctia
Moths described in 1907